Gennadiy Nikolaevich Aygi (21 August 1934 in Schaymurzino, Batyrevsky District – 21 February 2006 in Moscow) was a Chuvash poet and a translator. His poetry is written both in Chuvash and in Russian.

He was born in the village of Shaimurzino (Çĕnyal), Chuvashia (USSR), moved to Moscow in 1953 and stayed there for the rest of his life. Aygi started writing poetry in the Chuvash language in 1958.

Among the recognitions he has won are the Andrey Bely Prize (1987), the Pasternak Prize (2000, the first to be awarded this), the Prize of the French Academy (1972), the Petrarch Prize (1993), the Golden Wreath of the Struga Poetry Evenings in 1994 and the Jan Smrek Prize (Bratislava, Slovakia).

In 2003 Aygi participated in the "international literature festival berlin" .

Sofia Gubaidulina set several of his poems to music in her cycle Jetzt immer Schnee ("Now always snow").

His son Aleksey Aygi is a composer.

References

External links 
 Month-long tribute to Aygi  essay and collection of links
 Interview with Aygi's friend and translator Peter France at New Directions

Folk poets of Chuvashia
Russian male poets
Chuvash-language poets
1934 births
2006 deaths
Chuvash writers
Struga Poetry Evenings Golden Wreath laureates
20th-century Russian poets
People from Batyrevsky District
20th-century Russian male writers
Maxim Gorky Literature Institute alumni